High Voltage Software, Inc. (HVS) is an American video game developer based in Hoffman Estates, Illinois. Founded in April 1993 by Kerry J. Ganofsky, the company is best known for developing Lego Racers (1999), Hunter: The Reckoning (2002) and The Conduit (2009).

History 
High Voltage Software was founded by Kerry J. Ganofsky in April 1993, following his graduation from college. Out of Hoffman Estates, Illinois, a suburb of Chicago, the company started out with four employees and used old doors set on top of sawhorses as desks. In June 2006, the company had 160 employees.

In 2008 interviews, High Voltage leadership expressed interest in improving the quality of contemporary third-party Wii games. The company developed Quantum3, a game engine that specifically targets Wii deployment. The engine itself had been used in several previous titles made by the developer, but was heavily upgraded for higher performance on Wii.

In December 2014, Ganofsky announced that High Voltage would be opening a satellite studio for the company in Place St. Charles in New Orleans. The opening, scheduled for early 2015, would provide 80 new job opportunities in the area, with initial staff transferred from the company's Hoffman Estates headquarters. Through the opening, High Voltage was able to take advantage of local financial incentives, including a  performance-based grant to cover relocation costs, workforce training programs and a digital media incentive. Prior to the announcement, Ganofsky also considered opening the studio in Georgia or Florida, but found New Orleans to be a better cultural fit for High Voltage. As a result, talks between economic development leaders in the area and Ganofsky began in October 2013.

Unreleased Projects

The Grinder

In the late 2000s, High Voltage began developing a horror-themed shooter called The Grinder. The game initially began production exclusively for the Wii, the developers, as well as potential publishers for The Grinder, became less confident that the game would be a success on that system, as there were multiple instances of similar hardcore and/or graphically violent games designed for the Wii, such as MadWorld, House of the Dead: Overkill and Red Steel 2 that failed to sell many copies.  Development for the Wii version eventually began to wind down quietly by 2010, although High Voltage Software refused to state whether that version was officially cancelled.  The developers also designed PlayStation 3, Xbox 360 and PC versions of the game, which were initially going to play as first-person shooters like the Wii version, but plans for this ultimately fell through when it failed to appeal to candidate publishers and the developers realized that there was an ongoing oversatuation of the first-person shooter video game market.  After careful consideration, they decided to not only redesign the PS3, Xbox 360 and PC versions as a top-down shooter, but also change the game's setting, plot and character designs to a substantial degree.  Even so, candidate publishers were still uninterested in the top-down version as well, and the developers then covertly abandoned development and began shifting their efforts towards developing a sequel to The Conduit.

In 2013, High Voltage Software, in an interview, implied that one significant reason why it was difficult to release The Grinder was because it was being developed during a time when the video game industry was more interested in well-established intellectual properties, rather than newly introduced ones like that of The Grinder. The company then expressed hope that they can be in better position to launch new intellectual properties like The Grinder when a new generation of video games began.  However, having lost substantial money and jobs from the troubled development of The Grinder, as well as poor sales of Conduit 2, the company decided not to revisit The Grinder.

Games developed

Canceled 
 Thea Realm Fighters (Jaguar)
 Kid Vid Grid (Jaguar)
 Country Vid Grid (Jaguar)
 The Grinder (Wii, PlayStation 3, Xbox 360, Microsoft Windows)

References

External links 
 

1993 establishments in Illinois
2020 mergers and acquisitions
American companies established in 1993
American subsidiaries of foreign companies
Companies based in Cook County, Illinois
Hoffman Estates, Illinois
Keywords Studios
Video game companies established in 1993
Video game companies of the United States
Video game development companies
Video game publishers